The 2016 LA Galaxy II season was the club's third season of existence.

Players

Squad information 
Squad correct as of July 17, 2016.

Transfers

Transfers in

Transfers out

Competitions

Friendlies

USL

Standings

Regular season 
All times in Eastern Time Zone.

Playoffs

See also 
 2016 in American soccer
 2016 LA Galaxy season

References

External links 
 

LA Galaxy II seasons
LA Galaxy II
LA Galaxy II
LA Galaxy II